Lynn Bromley is an American politician and family therapist from Maine. From 2000 to 2008, Bromley, a Democrat, represented South Portland, Cape Elizabeth and Scarborough in the Maine Senate, where she was chair of the Joint Standing Committee on Business, Research and Economic Development. She was unable to run in 2008 because of term limits. In December 2010, she was appointed New England regional advocate for the federal Small Business Administration. She was recommended by Republican US Senator Susan Collins.

Bromley earned a B.A. from Bridgewater State College and a M.S.W. from Boston College.

References

Year of birth missing (living people)
Living people
Politicians from South Portland, Maine
Democratic Party Maine state senators
Businesspeople from Maine
Small Business Administration personnel
Bridgewater State University alumni
Boston College Graduate School of Social Work alumni
Women state legislators in Maine
21st-century American politicians
21st-century American women politicians